Royal Swedish Army Supply Administration (KAIF) was a Swedish administrative authority which existed from 1954 to 1963. It sorted under the Ministry of Defence and had the task, in technical and economic terms, to exercise the highest management and oversight of the commissariat service of the Swedish Army.

History and organisation

The Commissariat Department (Intendenturavdelningen) of the Royal Swedish Army Materiel Administration (KAFI) was reconstituted on 1 July 1954 as an independent agency under the name Arméintendenturförvaltningen ("Army Supply Administration"). After nine years of existence, the authority was on 1 July 1963 amalgamated into the newly formed Quartermaster Administration of the Swedish Armed Forces. (The Quartermaster Administration of the Swedish Armed Forces, in turn, was on 1 July 1968 amalgamated into the newly formed Defence Materiel Administration.)

The Chief of the Army was also head of the Royal Swedish Army Supply Administration. However, the closest command over the authority was exercised by a vice chief (souschef), who had the title of Quartermaster General. The vice chief was from 1954 to 1963 a member of the Administration Board of the Swedish Armed Forces.

The authority consisted of seven units from 1954 to 1959: Materielbyrån ("Equipment Bureau"), Förplägnadsbyrån ("Catering Bureau"), Drivmedelsbyrån ("Fuel Bureau"), Häst- och veterinärmaterielbyrån ("Horse and Veterinary Equipment Bureau"), Administrativa byrån ("Administrative Bureau"), Chefsexpeditionen ("Head Office") and Förrådskontrollkontoret ("Storeroom Control Bureau"). The head of the Häst- och veterinärmaterielbyrån ("Horse and Veterinary Equipment Bureau") was the Inspector of Army Veterinary Service. The head of the Administrativa byrån ("Administrative Bureau") was referred to as Krigsråd (military councillor). In 1959, the Chefsexpeditionen ("Head Office") was renamed Centralbyrån ("Central Bureau"), whilst Häst- och veterinärmaterielbyrån was amalgamated as Hästsektionen ("Horse Section") into the Centralbyrån ("Central Bureau"). Also Förrådskontrollkontoret ("Storeroom Control Bureau") was amalgamated into Centralbyrån. From 1959 to 1963, the units were thus only five: Centralbyrån ("Central Bureau"), Materielbyrån ("Equipment Bureau"), Förplägnadsbyrån ("Catering Bureau"), Drivmedelsbyrån ("Fuel Bureau") and Administrativa byrån ("Administrative Bureau").

The heads of the bureaus were members of the authority's board.

The authority's activities were regulated by the following instructions:
King in Council's provisional instruction for the Royal Swedish Army Supply Administration, Tjänstemeddelanden rörande lantförsvaret, serie A (TLA), 1954:44 (in force 1954-07-01–1959-06-30), with amendments in TLA 1957:53 (in force 1957-07-01).
King in Council's instruction for the Royal Swedish Army Supply Administration, SFS 1959:9 (in force 1959-07-01–1963-06-30), with amendments in SFS 1959:315 (in force 1959-07-01) and SFS 1961:473 (in force 1961-10-01).

Activities

1954 instruction
The authority's instruction of 1954 stated: “The Royal Swedish Army Supply Administration exercises under the King in Council in technical and economic terms, the top management and oversight of the commissariat administration in the Swedish Army." In addition, the authority was obliged:

1959 instruction
The authority's 1959 instruction stated: “The Royal Swedish Army Supply Administration exercises under the King in Council in technical and economic terms, the management and oversight of the commissariat administration in the Swedish Army." In addition, the authority was obliged:

Heads

Quartermaster Generals and Vice Chiefs
1954–1957: Major General Ivar Gewert
1957–1963: Major General Hilding Kring

Chief of Staff of the Quartermaster General at Chefsexpeditionen ("Head Office") (from 1959 the Centralbyrån ("Central Bureau")
1954–1963: Lieutenant Colonel Stig Leijonhufvud (promoted to colonel in 1958)

Heads of the Materielbyrån ("Equipment Bureau")
1954–1957: Colonel Ivan Modigh
1957–1963: Colonel Folke Diurlin

Heads of the Förplägnadsbyrån ("Catering Bureau")
1954–1959: Colonel Per Odensjö
1959–1963: Colonel Henning Björkman

Heads of the Drivmedelsbyrån ("Fuel Bureau")
1954–1961: Colonel Valdemar Swedenborg
1961–1963: Colonel Helge Blomquist

Heads of the Häst- och veterinärmaterielbyrån ("Horse and Veterinary Equipment Bureau")
1954–1957: Inspector of Army Veterinary Service Erik Liljefors
1957–1959: Inspector of Army Veterinary Service Gunnar Krantz

Heads of the Administrativa byrån ("Administrative Bureau")
1954–1955: Krigsråd (military councillor) Tage Östergren
1955–1957: Krigsråd Einar Nylander (died on 13 November 1957)
1958–1963: Krigsråd Åke Norrman

Heads of the Förrådskontrollkontoret ("Storeroom Control Bureau")
1954–1959: Lieutenant Colonel John Hilding Wilén

See also
Royal Swedish Air Force Materiel Administration
Royal Swedish Army Materiel Administration
Royal Swedish Naval Materiel Administration

References

Further reading

Military units and formations of the Swedish Army
Defunct government agencies of Sweden
Government agencies established in 1954
Government agencies disestablished in 1963
1954 establishments in Sweden
1963 disestablishments in Sweden